The Ralph Hall Farm District near Carrington, North Dakota, United States is a farm that was developed in 1898.  It was listed on the National Register of Historic Places in 1987.  It includes Classical Revival architecture in one or more of its three contributing buildings.

The house was designed by architect Glen Saxton of Minneapolis;  the house and barn were built by Henry Carroll.

References

1898 establishments in North Dakota
Neoclassical architecture in North Dakota
Farms on the National Register of Historic Places in North Dakota
Historic districts on the National Register of Historic Places in North Dakota
National Register of Historic Places in Foster County, North Dakota